The MGM Grand Garden Arena (originally known as the MGM Grand Garden Special Events Center) is a 17,000-seat multi-purpose arena located within the MGM Grand Las Vegas on the Las Vegas Strip.

Sporting events
From its opening on December 18, 1993, until the opening of the MGM co-owned T-Mobile Arena in 2016, MGM Grand Garden Arena along with the Thomas & Mack Center and Mandalay Bay Events Center were the main sports arenas in the Las Vegas area.

Professional wrestling 
From 1996 to 2000, it hosted World Championship Wrestling's Halloween Havoc events. The UWF television event Blackjack Brawl was held at the venue in 1994.

On May 25, 2019, it hosted All Elite Wrestling's inaugural event, Double or Nothing (2019). Tickets for the event sold out in four minutes. It was originally scheduled to host Double or Nothing (2020) on May 23, 2020, and the May 27 episode of AEW Dynamite, but was moved due to the COVID-19 pandemic.

It hosted Money in the Bank on July 2, 2022, which was originally scheduled to be held at the larger Allegiant Stadium. This marked the first WWE pay-per-view to have taken place at the arena.

Combat sports 
The arena is well known for numerous professional boxing superfights, such as Evander Holyfield vs. Mike Tyson II, Oscar De La Hoya vs. Floyd Mayweather Jr., Oscar De La Hoya vs. Manny Pacquiao, Floyd Mayweather Jr. vs. Canelo Álvarez, Floyd Mayweather Jr. vs. Manny Pacquiao, and Deontay Wilder vs. Tyson Fury II.

On September 7, 1996, the Bruce Seldon vs. Mike Tyson bout was held here; later that night, rapper Tupac Shakur (who attended the fight) was shot in a drive-by attack. He succumbed to his injuries six days later.

The arena held 42 Ultimate Fighting Championship mixed martial arts events, starting with UFC 34 in 2001 and ending with The Ultimate Fighter 23 Finale in 2016. UFC currently uses the T-Mobile Arena for major events.

On May 2, 2015, Floyd Mayweather Jr. defended his world title in a highly anticipated match against fellow superstar Manny Pacquiao. The fight continued to the 12th round and Mayweather retained his title. Within the crowd, celebrities such as hip-hop artist Jay-Z, UFC fighter Ronda Rousey and former NBA superstar Michael Jordan were present.

Professional sports
In 1994, the Las Vegas Dustdevils, an indoor soccer team in the Continental Indoor Soccer League played one season at the arena. It also previously served through 2015 as the pre-season home for select Los Angeles Kings games against the Colorado Avalanche, Phoenix Coyotes and San Jose Sharks, known as Frozen Fury.  Two more games occurred at the new T-Mobile Arena before the launch of the NHL's newest team, the Vegas Golden Knights, who went on to play in the NHL's Stanley Cup Playoffs within their first season.

On October 24, 2014, it held an NBA preseason game between the Los Angeles Lakers and the Sacramento Kings.

College sports
During the 1990s, the arena served as the site for the WAC women's volleyball tournament.

On March 13, 2012, it was announced that the Pac-12 men's basketball tournament would take place at the arena from at least 2013 through 2016  and then to T-Mobile Arena in 2017 until 2020.

From 2014 to 2017, the MGM Grand Garden Arena hosted The Roman Main Event, then called The MGM Resorts Main Event, an 8-team college basketball tournament held during Monday and Wednesday of Thanksgiving week of NCAA Division I men's basketball season.

Bull riding
The Professional Bull Riders (PBR) held its annual World Finals event at the MGM Arena from 1994 to 1998 before moving to the Thomas & Mack Center in 1999 and then to T-Mobile Arena in 2016. The PBR later returned on June 11 and 12, 2021 for an Unleash the Beast Series event in its first visit to the MGM Arena since 1998.

Awards shows

Latin Grammy Awards
The MGM Grand Garden Arena has hosted the Latin Grammy Awards six times. The arena hosted the Latin Grammy Awards in 2014, 2015, and from 2017 to 2019. It was most recently held at the arena in 2021.

Grammy Awards

The arena hosted the 64th Annual Grammy Awards on April 3, 2022, marking the first time the Grammy Awards were held in Las Vegas.

Academy of Country Music Awards
The venue was a consistent site for the Academy of Country Music Awards and has served as host twelve times since 2006, including 2018's event which was the first following the 2017 Las Vegas shooting, which occurred roughly 1 mile away. The ceremony moved to Allegiant Stadium in 2022.

Other events

Phish Halloween
Improvisational jam band Phish has hosted several significant halloween concerts at the venue. On October 31, 2014, they performed Chilling, Thrilling Sounds of the Haunted House with original instrumental music to accompany the album as their "musical costume" for the second set of their Halloween night show at the venue. Following that performance, the band has made their interpretation of "Martian Monster" a regular part of their concert repertoire and have performed it at over 25 subsequent concerts. On October 31, 2016, the band covered David Bowie's The Rise and Fall of Ziggy Stardust and the Spiders from Mars in its entirety as their musical costume for the evening. On October 31, 2018, the band performed a set of all-new original material that they promoted as a "cover" of í rokk by "Kasvot Växt", a fictional 1980s Scandinavian progressive rock band they had created. On October 31, 2021, they performed the album Get More Down by another fictional band of their creation, "Sci-Fi Soldier."

Concerts

Gallery

References

External links
 

 
1993 establishments in Nevada
Basketball venues in Nevada
Boxing venues in Las Vegas
Buildings and structures in Paradise, Nevada
Defunct indoor soccer venues in the United States
Indoor arenas in Las Vegas
Mixed martial arts venues in Nevada
Music venues in the Las Vegas Valley
Sports venues completed in 1993
Sports venues in Las Vegas
Volleyball venues in the United States
Grammy Award venues